Patriarch Anthimus of Constantinople may refer to:

 Anthimus I of Constantinople, Ecumenical Patriarch in 535–536
 Anthimus II of Constantinople, Ecumenical Patriarch in 1623
 Anthimus III of Constantinople, Ecumenical Patriarch in  1822–1824
 Anthimus IV of Constantinople, Ecumenical Patriarch in 1840–1841 and 1848–1852
 Anthimus V of Constantinople, Ecumenical Patriarch in 1841–1842
 Anthimus VI of Constantinople, Ecumenical Patriarch in 1845–1848, 1853–1855, and 1871–1873
 Anthimus VII of Constantinople, Ecumenical Patriarch in 1895–1896